Charlie Howard may refer to:

 Charlie Howard (murder victim) (1961–1984), gay-bashing victim killed in 1984
 Charles F. Howard (1942–2017), known as Charlie, Texas state representative
 Charlie Howard (footballer) (born 1989), footballer currently playing for Gillingham
 Charlie Howard (cricketer) (1854–1929), English cricketer

See also
Charles Howard (disambiguation)